Miran Tepeš (born 25 April 1961) is a Slovenian former ski jumper and current ski jumping official who competed for Yugoslavia from 1979 to 1992. He won a silver medal in the team large hill competition at the 1988 Winter Olympics in Calgary.

His best finish at the FIS Ski Jumping World Cup was 2nd a total of seven times between 1985 and 1990.

After retiring, Tepeš started working as a FIS competition official. His son Jurij Tepeš and daughter Anja Tepeš are also ski jumpers.

Miran Tepeš is also a passionate sailor, who has circumnavigated the world 2 times with his own sailing boat "Skokica". His first trip around the world was between the years 2006 and 2008, his second trip (including Cape Horn) started in 2010 and was finished in autumn 2012.

External links
 . SLO nationality
 

1961 births
Living people
Yugoslav male ski jumpers
Slovenian male ski jumpers
Ski jumpers at the 1980 Winter Olympics
Ski jumpers at the 1984 Winter Olympics
Ski jumpers at the 1988 Winter Olympics
Olympic ski jumpers of Yugoslavia
Olympic silver medalists for Yugoslavia
Olympic medalists in ski jumping
Medalists at the 1988 Winter Olympics
Skiers from Ljubljana